Werenskiold, also spelled Werenschiold, Wærenskiold, Werenskjold etcetera, is a Danish and Norwegian noble family living in Norway.

History
Werner Nielssen (1625-1695)  relocated to Farsund in Vest-Agder from Ribe in Jutland. He was a lawyer who in 1664, became councilor in Christiania (now Oslo).  He was married 1.) in 1662 to Christiania M. Ingeborg Eriksdatter (d. 1664) through whom he acquired Borregård Manor (Borregård Hovedgård) in Sarpsborg; 2.) in 1667 with Helvig Christensdatter (1653-1692). In 1674, he bought  Hafslund Manor (Hafslund Hovedgård) in Sarpsborg. He was the father of three sons:  Niels Wernersen took over Hafslund Manor,  Jens Wernersen  took over  Borregård Manor, Christian Wernersen  who acquired  Trosvik in Fredrikstad. 

His son Niels Wernersen (1669-1741) was married in  1698 to Elisabeth de Tønsberg (1673-1742),  daughter of Mads Mathias de Tønsberg, (Amtmann over Buskerud) and Anne Cathrine Willumsdatter Mecklenburg.  He became county governor of Smålenen (now Østfold)  and assistant council at the Supreme Court. Niels Wernersen was in 1717 ennobled under the name Werenschiold with a new coat of arms.

Notable Family members 
 Dagfin Werenskiold
 Erik Werenskiold
 Werner Werenskiold
 :no:Nils Werenskiold

See also 
 Danish nobility
 Norwegian nobility

References

Related reading
Werenskjold, Rolf  (1999) Slekten Werenskiold - Wærnschiold : 1625-1999 : den vestre linje (Volda : R.F. Werenskjold)  

Danish noble families
Norwegian noble families